Wrong No. 2 (also written as Wrong Number 2) is a 2019 Pakistani romantic comedy film. It is a sequel to the 2015 film Wrong No., directed by Yasir Nawaz, produced by Sh Amjad Rasheed and Hassan Zia. It is the second installment in Wrong No. film series. The film features Sami Khan and Neelam Muneer in leading roles. Supporting cast includes Jawed Sheikh, Mehmood Aslam, Ahmad Hassan and Danish Nawaz.

The film was released on Eid ul Fitr, 5 June 2019, and was distributed by Distribution Club and Eros International. The film emerged as a box-office success and became the third highest-grossing Pakistani film of 2019.

Plot 
Neelum Munir stars as Zoya, a rich heiress who falls in love with a man who is not as financially stable as herself. Her father mistakes her lover for someone else and they face a comedy of errors

Cast
 Sami Khan as Omar 
 Neelam Muneer as Zoya
 Mehmood Aslam as Wazir
 Jawed Sheikh as Gul Nawaz
 Shafqat Cheema as Chaudhary
 Danish Nawaz as Sexy Shaukat
 Yasir Nawaz as Mehboob
 Sana Fakhar as Masooma
 Ahmed Hassan as Happy
 Irfan Khoosat as Gogi
 Ashraf Khan as Abu Jan (cameo appearance)
 Fareeha Jabeen as Abu Jan's wife
 Shehnaz Pervaiz as Aunty (cameo appearance)
 Yashma Gill (special appearance in "Gali Gali" song)
 Nida Yasir (cameo appearance)

Release
The first teaser of the film was released on 13 April 2019. The film was released on 5 June 2019.

Reception

Box office 
On its first day the film collected 1.60 crores. The film earned a total of 10.60 crores in its first weekend. After eight weeks it earned Rs. 200.00 crores (domestic) and Rs. 16.5 crores (overseas).

Critical reception 
Hassan Hassan of Galaxy Lollywood rated the film 3.5 out of 5 stars saying that If you have loved JPNA series or any other feel-good masala entertainers that don't defy logic, Wrong Number 2 is the film you should go for. There are very high chances that you will leave the cinema halls amused, for all the right reasons. Zeeshan Ahmad of The Express Tribune remarked, ''Wrong No 2 lays groundwork for a plot only to completely ignore it later. The central romance is shallow and half-baked, with the only upside to the film a few moments of genuine humour.''

Soundtrack 
The music of the film is composed by Simaab Sen while lyrics are written by Fatima Najeeb, Ahsan Ali Taj and others.

See also
 List of Pakistani films of 2019

References

External links
 

Pakistani romantic comedy films
2019 romantic comedy films
2010s Urdu-language films
Lollywood films
Pakistani action comedy films
2019 films
Pakistani sequel films